Lau Yun Yi is a Hongkonger footballer who plays as a defender. She has been a member of the Hong Kong women's national team.

International career 
Lau Yun Yi capped for Hong Kong at senior level during the 2014 AFC Women's Asian Cup qualification and the 2016 AFC Women's Olympic Qualifying Tournament.

See also 
 List of Hong Kong women's international footballers

References

External links

Living people
Hong Kong women's footballers
Women's association football defenders
Hong Kong women's international footballers
Year of birth missing (living people)